USS Nightingale was originally the tea clipper and slave ship Nightingale, launched in 1851.  captured her off Africa in 1861; the United States Navy then purchased her.

During the American Civil War Nightingale served as a supply ship and collier supporting Union Navy ships blockading the Confederate States of America. After the war the Navy sold Nightingale, which went on to a long career in Arctic exploration and merchant trading before foundering in the North Atlantic in 1893.

History

Construction
Nightingale was designed and built at the Hanscom Shipyard in Eliot, Maine in 1851 by Samuel Hanscomb, Jr., receiving final fitting out in nearby Portsmouth, New Hampshire.

Tea races

Passenger trade to Australia
{{quotation|In the spring of 1853 Nightingale, still commanded by Captain Mather, because of her speed and general record was chartered by the Australian Pioneer Line, R. W. Cameron and Co., to carry mails, passengers, and freights to Melbourne, with the understanding that she was to proceed from there to China ports, where she would load with tea and silk for London. The gold fever in Australia was reaching its height, and Nightingale'''s accommodations were speedily taken.}}

As a slaver

Seizure

About midnight on 20–21 April 1861, two boats from sloop of war  pulled silently toward a darkened ship anchored near the mouth of the Congo River at Cabinda, Angola. After clambering aboard Nightingale, a suspected slaver from Boston, Massachusetts, the American sailors and marines found 961 men, women, and children chained between decks. 160 would die en route to Liberia. At the point of capture, the prize was preparing to load more slaves before getting under way for America.

As a prizeSaratogas skipper – Commander Alfred Taylor – placed a prize crew on Nightingale, commanded by the leader of the boarding party, Lieutenant James J. Guthrie. The captured clipper got under way on the 23rd for Liberia, a nation founded in 1822 by the American Colonization Society as a refuge for freed slaves.En route, a fever raged through the ship killing 160 of the passengers and one member of the crew. After arriving Monrovia on 7 May, Nightingale landed her passengers, fumigated living quarters, and sailed for home on 13 May. During the first part of the passage, fever seriously weakened the crew, at one point leaving only 7 of her 34-man crew fit for duty. Two more sailors died before the scourge began to subside, enabling the ship to reach New York on 15 June.

Purchase by US NavyNightingale was condemned by the New York prize court; purchased by the US Navy which was then expanding to blockade the Confederate coast, and commissioned on 18 August 1861, Brevet Master David B. Horne in command.

As a store ship
Fitted out as a collier and store ship, Nightingale got underway south laden with coal the same day, stopped at Hampton Roads on the 21st, and pushed on toward Key West, Florida the following morning. But for occasional voyages north for coal and supplies, she served on the U.S. Gulf Coast through the first years of the American Civil War.

During the action she ran aground, but the Southern ships did not press their advantage. Nightingale was refloated a few days later, and she sailed to New York with prisoners of war and booty.Nightingale returned to the Gulf late in the year with a cargo of coal and supplies for the Union Blockaders. During most of 1862, she served the East Gulf Blockading Squadron operating out of Key West. Early in 1863, she became an ordnance ship at Pensacola, Florida, and continued this duty until returning to Boston, Massachusetts on 9 June 1864.

Nightingale was decommissioned at the Boston Navy Yard on 20 June 1864 and sold at public auction there to D.E. Mayo on 11 February 1865.

Arctic explorationNightingale served as the flagship of the 1865–1867 Western Union Telegraph Expedition exploring British Columbia, Alaska, and Siberia toward the aim of laying telegraph cable across the Bering Strait.

Loss
After the arctic expedition, Nightingale remained in merchant service until she foundered in the North Atlantic Ocean on 17 April 1893.

FigureheadNightingale'''s Jenny Lind figurehead ended up in the hands of a Swedish antique dealer in 1994. He spent 13 years researching its history.

See also

Union Navy
List of ships captured in the 19th century

References

External links
 Clipper ship Nightingale, the Jenny Lind Figurehead
 Challenger and Nightingale, painting
  Commodore Perkins on Nightingale slaver captain Bowen
  Background of slaver captain Frank Bowen

Slave ships
Tea clippers
Ships built in Maine
Gunboats of the United States Navy
Ships of the Union Navy
Colliers of the United States Navy
American Civil War auxiliary ships of the United States
Stores ships of the United States Navy
Age of Sail merchant ships of the United States
Merchant ships of the United States
Merchant ships of Brazil
Arctic exploration vessels
Merchant ships of Norway
Barques
Maritime incidents in 1861
Shipwrecks in the Atlantic Ocean
1851 ships
Nightingale
Captured ships
Jenny Lind
Extreme clippers